Platycheirus sticticus is a species of hoverfly. It is found in many parts of Europe across to Siberia.

Description
External images
For terms see Morphology of Diptera Tibiae 1 only slightly dilated at apex and with only scattered short, hair-like lateral bristles, yellow with a dark lateral marking at midlength.

See references for determination

Distribution
Palearctic Southern Sweden and Denmark South to the Pyrenees and North Spain. Ireland East through Central Europe into Russia and on to eastern Siberia.

Biology
Habitat Picea, Pinus plantation and Quercus woodland. Flies May to August.

References

Diptera of Europe
Syrphinae
Insects described in 1822